Percival Alfred Siebold (13 June 1917 – 1 June 1983) was a British scouting administrator who served as the Executive Commissioner for Operations of the World Scout Bureau.

In 1967, Siebold was awarded the 48th Bronze Wolf, the only distinction of the World Organization of the Scout Movement, awarded by the World Scout Committee for exceptional services to world Scouting.

References

External links

complete list

1917 births
1983 deaths
Recipients of the Bronze Wolf Award
Scouting and Guiding in the United Kingdom